Looking Glass Studios was an American video game developer founded in 1990 as Blue Sky Productions by Paul Neurath in Salem, New Hampshire. The company's first game was Ultima Underworld: The Stygian Abyss in 1992, which received widespread critical acclaim and sold nearly 500,000 units. Looking Glass proceeded to develop titles in multiple genres, including role-playing, sports, flight simulation, and stealth video games. These titles were primarily published by Origin Systems, Electronic Arts and Eidos Interactive, with three titles self-published by Looking Glass Studios.

Looking Glass' products were praised for innovations in video game technology and design. Several of their successes, such as Flight Unlimited and Thief: The Dark Project, sold over half a million copies each. Poor sales of their final two self-published games—Terra Nova: Strike Force Centauri (1996) and British Open Championship Golf (1997)—left the company in financial turmoil, however. This, combined with multiple failed business deals, including a temporary merger with Intermetrics from 1997–1999, led the company to close on May 24, 2000, and cancel several projects in development. Its final project, Jane's Attack Squadron, was completed by Mad Doc Software and released by Xicat Interactive in 2002. In total, Looking Glass Studios released 12 original games in its 10 years of activity, alongside several ports and other spin-offs.

Games

Cancelled

References

External links
Official website (Archived)

 
Looking Glass Studios